The 1938 Lincoln County Courthouse is an Art Moderne style building in Pioche, Nevada.  The 1938 courthouse replaced the so-called "million-dollar courthouse" built in 1871, whose last payment on the approximately $800,000 it cost was coincidentally made in 1938.

In 1937, Lincoln County began to receive the proceeds of a major boom in lead and zinc mining that ran through the 1950s and provided a major portion of the county's tax revenues. As the old county courthouse deteriorated, sentiment grew to replace it, resulting in a 1937 bond issue. At the same time the county received a grant of $26,800 from the Public Works Administration toward 45% of the cost of a new courthouse. The PWA money carried conditions, one of which was a close review of the design. A modern look was preferred, to the point that a simplified Art Deco-Art Moderne style became known as PWA Moderne. The new courthouse was designed by Las Vegas architect A.L. Worswick in this taste.

After an initial bidding process in which all bids were above the $60,000 budget, a second bid in 1938 produced a low bid of $49,347. The bidder, L.F. Dow of Los Angeles and Las Vegas, completed the courthouse in 1939. The building has served as the county courthouse, jail, county sheriff's office, and state office building ever since. It was placed on the National Register of Historic Places in 2002.

References

External links

Courthouses on the National Register of Historic Places in Nevada
Government buildings completed in 1938
County courthouses in Nevada
Buildings and structures in Lincoln County, Nevada
Streamline Moderne architecture in Nevada
Historic American Buildings Survey in Nevada
PWA Moderne architecture
National Register of Historic Places in Lincoln County, Nevada
Lincoln County Courthouse